Helmut Faeder (3 July 1935 - 3 August 2014) was a former German international footballer who played as a midfielder for Hertha BSC and Hertha Zehlendorf.

References

External links
 
 

1935 births
2014 deaths
German footballers
Germany international footballers
Hertha BSC players
Bundesliga players
Hertha Zehlendorf players
People from Oberhavel
Association football midfielders
Footballers from Brandenburg
West German footballers